Letheobia kibarae, also known as the Upemba gracile blind snake or Katanga beaked snake, is a species of snakes in the family Typhlopidae. It is endemic to southern Democratic Republic of the Congo. Its type locality is in the Upemba National Park.

References

Further reading
 de Witte, G.F. 1953. Exploration du Parc National de l'Upemba. Mission G.F. de Witte en collaboration avec W. Adam, A. Janssens, L. van Meel et R. Verheyen (1946-1949). Reptiles. Institut des Parcs Nationaux du Congo Belge. Brussels. 6: 1–322.

Letheobia
Snakes of Africa
Reptiles of the Democratic Republic of the Congo
Endemic fauna of the Democratic Republic of the Congo
Taxa named by Gaston-François de Witte
Reptiles described in 1953